The 1944 All-Ireland Senior Football Championship was the 58th staging of Ireland's premier Gaelic football knock-out competition.

Roscommon won their second title in a row and, so far, their last. Kilkenny's final year in the Leinster championship until 1961.

Results

Connacht Senior Football Championship

Leinster Senior Football Championship

Munster Senior Football Championship

Ulster Senior Football Championship

All-Ireland Senior Football Championship

Championship statistics

Miscellaneous

 The Kilkenny vs Wexford game was Kilkenny's last championship game until 1961 final game to be played at New Ross until 1997. 
 The Clones pitch becomes St Tiernach's Park.
 Tralee's pitch becomes known as Austin Stack Park which is named after Austin Stack.
 Carlow win their first ever Leinster title.
 The All Ireland semi final meeting of Kerry and Carlow was their first championship meeting.
 Roscommon are All Ireland Champions for 2 in a row.

References